The Nordic Cup Open is a darts tournament held at various locations in five Nordic countries – Denmark, Finland, Iceland, Norway and Sweden. First edition of the tournament took place in 1981 in Espoo, Finland. Tournament was held as "Open", but only citizens of the Nordic countries can take part in the tournament. Since 1981 tournaments was held every year. From 1996 to 2018 was held every second year. Last edition of this tournament was take place in 2022 after four years due the interruption caused by COVID-19 pandemic.

Among men, the tournament was most often won by representatives of Finland and Sweden, but the last victory of the Finnish player was recorded in 2004. Among women, the representatives of Finland achieved the greatest number of victories.

List of tournaments

Men's

Women's

References 

Darts tournaments
1981 establishments in Europe
Recurring sporting events established in 1981